Flustridae is a family of bryozoans in the suborder Flustrina.

References

External links 
 
 

Cheilostomatida
Bryozoan families